The 2020 Pac-12 Conference men's soccer season is be the 21st season of men's varsity soccer in the conference. The season began on February 3, 2021, and will end on April 17.

Effects of the Covid-19 pandemic 
The season was set to begin in August 2020 and conclude in November 2020.  Due to the COVID-19 pandemic, the Pac-12 Conference postponed sports through the end of the calendar year.

On September 22, 2020, the NCAA approved a plan to play the fall championships in the spring.

Teams

Stadiums and Locations

Matches 

Source:

Non-conference

Conference

Week 1 (Feb. 15 – Feb. 21)

Week 2 (Feb. 22 – Feb. 28)

Week 3 (Mar. 1 – Mar. 7)

Week 4 (Mar. 8 – Mar. 14)

Week 5 (Mar. 15  – Mar. 21)

Week 6 (Mar. 22 – Mar. 28)

Week 7 (Mar. 29 – Apr. 4)

Week 8 (Apr. 5 – Apr. 11)

Week 9 (Apr. 12 – Apr. 18)

References

External links 
 Pac-12 Men's Soccer

 
2020 NCAA Division I men's soccer season